Sculpture at Schoenthal is an art foundation in Switzerland.  It is named after the Schönthal Monastery, a former church near the village of Langenbruck, Basel-Landschaft, which is now used for temporary art exhibitions.  An array of sculptures, including some by well-known artists, is dotted around the monastery area and the surrounding countryside.

The monastery and foundation

Schönthal Monastery was built in approximately 1140. It was annulled during the Reformation in 1529, after which it was used variously as a toolshed, dairy farm and brickworks.  In 1967 it was put under cultural heritage management, and in 1986 the first archaeological digs and renovations began.

Sculpture at Schoenthal was opened in 2000 as a "cultural meeting place" incorporating the monastery and surrounding area, with the motto "Art and nature in dialogue".  The following year its founder, John Schmid, transferred the entire set-up to the newly established Sculpture at Schoenthal Foundation.  The historic building now serves as a gallery for temporary exhibitions and as a seminar venue.

Sculptures and artists

A number of well-known Swiss and international artists have integrated works of sculpture into the surrounding Jura countryside, including Tony Cragg, Nigel Hall, Richard Long and David Nash.

Notes

External links

 Sculpture at Schoenthal home page 

Culture in Basel
Sculpture gardens, trails and parks in Europe
Tourist attractions in Basel-Landschaft
Swiss art
Buildings and structures in Basel-Landschaft